The Western Interior Seaway (also called the Cretaceous Seaway, the Niobraran Sea, the North American Inland Sea, and the Western Interior Sea) was a large inland sea that split the continent of North America into two landmasses. The ancient sea, which existed from the early Late Cretaceous (100 million years ago) to the earliest Paleocene (66 Ma), connected the Gulf of Mexico, through the United States and Canada, to the Arctic Ocean. The two land masses it created were Laramidia to the west and Appalachia to the east.

Origin and geology

By Late-Cretaceous times, Eurasia and the Americas had separated along the south Atlantic, and subduction on the west coast of the Americas had commenced, resulting in the Laramide orogeny, the early phase of growth of the modern Rocky Mountains. The Western Interior Seaway may be seen as a downwarping of the continental crust ahead of the growing Laramide/Rockies mountain chain. 

The earliest phase of the Seaway began in the mid-Cretaceous period when an arm of the Arctic Ocean transgressed south over western North America; this formed the Mowry Sea, so named for the Mowry Shale, an organic-rich rock formation. In the south, the Gulf of Mexico was originally an extension of the Tethys Sea. In time, the southern embayment merged with the Mowry Sea in the late Cretaceous, forming the "complete" Seaway, creating isolated environments for land animals and plants. 

Relative sea levels fell multiple times, as a margin of land temporarily rose above the water along the ancestral Transcontinental Arch, each time rejoining the separated, divergent land populations, allowing a temporary mixing of newer species before again separating the populations.

Two great continental watersheds drained into it from east and west, diluting its waters and bringing resources in eroded silt that formed shifting delta systems along its low-lying coasts. There was little sedimentation on the eastern shores of the Seaway; the western boundary, however, consisted of a thick clastic wedge eroded eastward from the Sevier orogenic belt. The western shore was thus highly variable, depending on variations in sea level and sediment supply.

Widespread carbonate deposition suggests that the Seaway was warm and tropical, with abundant calcareous planktonic algae. Remnants of these deposits are found in northwest Kansas. A prominent example is Monument Rocks, an exposed chalk formation towering  over the surrounding range land. It is designated a National Natural Landmark and one of the Eight Wonders of Kansas.

During the late Cretaceous, the Western Interior Seaway went through multiple periods of anoxia, when the bottom water was devoid of oxygen and the water column was stratified.

At the end of the Cretaceous, continued Laramide uplift hoisted the sandbanks (sandstone) and muddy brackish lagoons (shale), thick sequences of silt and sandstone still seen today as the Laramie Formation, while low-lying basins between them gradually subsided. The Western Interior Seaway divided across the Dakotas and retreated south towards the Gulf of Mexico. This shrunken, and final regressive phase is sometimes called the Pierre Seaway.

During the early Paleocene, parts of the Western Interior Seaway still occupied areas of the Mississippi Embayment, submerging the site of present-day Memphis. Later transgression, however, was associated with the Cenozoic Tejas sequence, rather than with the previous event responsible for the Seaway.

Fauna
The Western Interior Seaway was a shallow sea, filled with abundant marine life. Interior Seaway denizens included predatory marine reptiles such as plesiosaurs, and mosasaurs. Other sea life included invertebrates such as mollusks, ammonites, squid-like belemnites, and plankton including coccolithophores that secreted the chalky platelets that give the Cretaceous its name, foraminiferans and radiolarians.

The Western Interior Seaway was home to early birds, including the flightless Hesperornis that had stout legs for swimming through water and tiny wings used for marine steering rather than flight; and the tern-like Ichthyornis, an early avian with a toothy beak. Ichthyornis shared the sky with large pterosaurs such as Nyctosaurus and Pteranodon. Pteranodon fossils are very common; it was probably a major participant in the surface ecosystem, though it was found in only the southern reaches of the Seaway.

Inoceramids (oyster-like bivalve molluscs) were well-adapted to life in the oxygen-poor bottom mud of the seaway. These left abundant fossils in the Kiowa, Greenhorn, Niobrara, Mancos, and Pierre formations. There is great variety in the shells and the many distinct species have been dated and can be used to identify specific beds in those rock formations of the seaway. Many species can easily fit in the palm of the hand, while some like Inoceramus (Haploscapha) grandis could be well over a meter in diameter. Entire schools of fish sometimes sought shelter within the shell of the giant Platyceramus.  The shells of the genus are known for being composed of prismatic calcitic crystals that grew perpendicular to the surface, and fossils often retain a pearly luster.

See also

References

Further reading

External links
 Marine Reptiles of South Dakota
 Paleo Map Project
 Cretaceous paleogeography, southwestern US

Cretaceous paleogeography
Geology of Canada
Geology of North America
Geology of the United States
Historical oceans
Paleocene paleogeography